Glattbrugg railway station is a railway station in Switzerland, in the Glattbrugg area of the municipality of Opfikon. The station is located on the main line of the Oerlikon–Bülach line and is an interchange point between the Zürich S-Bahn and the Stadtbahn Glattal light rail system. 

The station is served by S-Bahn lines S3, S9 and S15, and by Zürich tram routes 10 and 12, operating on behalf of the Stadtbahn Glattal. Glattbrugg station is some  walk from Opfikon station on S-Bahn line S7.

A large rail-served fuel depot is located to the west of the station, which is used to handle aviation fuel supplies to the nearby Zurich International Airport.

References

External links 
 
 

Railway stations in the canton of Zürich
Swiss Federal Railways stations
Opfikon